The men's 3 kilometres walk event was part of the track and field athletics programme at the 1920 Summer Olympics. The competition was held  on the track on Friday, August 20, 1920, and on Saturday, August 21, 1920. Twenty-two race walkers from twelve nations competed.

Records

These were the standing world and Olympic records (in minutes) prior to the 1920 Summer Olympics.

Every race saw a new Olympic record. At first Donato Pavesi bettered the record in the first semifinal with 13:46.8 minutes. In the second semifinal his fellow countryman Ugo Frigerio improved the record with 13:40.2 minutes. In the final Frigerio again set a new Olympic record with 13:14.2 minutes. As the competition has been discontinued, his Olympic record still stands.

Results

Semifinals

The semifinals were held on Friday, August 20, 1920.

Semifinal 1

Semifinal 2

Final

The final was held on Saturday, August 21, 1920.

References

Sources
 
 

Walk 3 kilometre
Racewalking at the Olympics